Poch'ŏn County is a kun, or county, in Ryanggang Province, North Korea. It looks westward across the Amrok River at China.

Geography
The Masingryong Mountains pass through the county, which slopes downward gradually to the west. The county sits atop the Paektu Plateau, with the mountains rising to only a small relative height. The highest peak is Namp'ot'aesan (남포태산). There are numerous streams, of which the chief is the Karimch'ŏn. Some 83% of the county's area is taken up by forestland. The temperatures are quite cold.

Economy
The predominant local industry is logging. There are also deposits of magnetite, alunite, and obsidian. Poch'ŏn's farms produce potatoes, wheat and barley, among other crops; orchards and livestock farms are also found.

Transportation
Poch'ŏn is served by the Samjiyŏn and Poch'ŏn (Paektusan Rimch'ŏl) lines of the Korean State Railway, and also by roads.

Administrative divisions 
Pochon-gun is divided into 1 up (town), 2 rodongjagu (workers' districts) and 17 ri (villages):

See also

Geography of North Korea
Administrative divisions of North Korea
Ryanggang
Battle of Pochonbo
Pochonbo Electronic Ensemble

References

External links

Counties of Ryanggang